Scott DeLano (born September 20, 1971) is an American politician who has served in the Mississippi State Senate from the 50th district since 2020. He previously served in the Mississippi House of Representatives from the 117th district from 2009 to 2020.

References

1971 births
Living people
Republican Party members of the Mississippi House of Representatives
Republican Party Mississippi state senators
People from Hendersonville, North Carolina
Politicians from Biloxi, Mississippi
21st-century American politicians